Hnutove is a village in Donetsk Oblast of eastern Ukraine, at 23,2 km northeast from the centre of Mariupol.

The village is situated on the left bank of the Kalmius river that became the boundary between Donetsk People's Republic-controlled territory on the east bank of the river, and Ukrainian government-controlled territory on the west bank, after an offensive by the pro-Russian forces of the Donetsk People's Republic in August 2014 during the War in Donbas. On 3 February 2022, the town was targeted by separatist artillery.

Demographics

References

Villages in Mariupol Raion